Statistics of Premier League of Bosnia and Herzegovina in the 2004–2005 season.

Overview
It was contested by 16 teams, and HŠK Zrinjski Mostar won the championship.

Clubs and stadiums

League standings

Results

Top goalscorers

References

Bosnia-Herzegovina - List of final tables (RSSSF)

Premier League of Bosnia and Herzegovina seasons
1
Bosnia